is a railway station on the Kagoshima Main Line operated by Kyushu Railway Company in Kagoshima, Kagoshima, Japan.

The station opened in 1954.

Lines 
Kyushu Railway Company
Kagoshima Main Line

JR

Adjacent stations

Nearby places
Matsumoto Junior High School
Matsumoto Hiranooka Gym
Matsumoto Post Office
Kagoshima City Hall Matsumoto Branch Office

Railway stations in Kagoshima Prefecture
Railway stations in Japan opened in 1954